Jetsons: The Movie is a 1990 American animated science fiction comedy film based on the animated television series The Jetsons, produced by Hanna-Barbera Productions and distributed by Universal Pictures. The film was directed by William Hanna and Joseph Barbera from a screenplay by Dennis Marks, and stars the voices of George O'Hanlon, Penny Singleton, Don Messick and Mel Blanc, all series veterans, alongside Tiffany as Judy Jetson. The story follows George Jetson, who is tasked with running a new Spacely Sprockets facility by his boss Cosmo Spacely. However, after he brings his family along to support him, they uncover the tragic truth of the facility's location.

The film was released on July 6, 1990. It grossed $20.3 million on a budget of $8 million during its theatrical run, though it was considered a box office disappointment and received mixed reviews. O'Hanlon and Blanc died during production of the film, which was dedicated to both their memories. 

Jetsons: The Movie was the last theatrical film to be directed by William Hanna and Joseph Barbera before their deaths, in 2001 and 2006 respectively. It was also the final Jetsons production until the release of The Jetsons & WWE: Robo-WrestleMania! in 2017. 

Although Warner Bros. Discovery owns the rights to the majority of the Hanna-Barbera library, including the rights to The Jetsons, the rights to this film are owned by Universal Pictures.

Plot
In the late 21st century, Spacely Sprockets and Spindles has opened a new mining colony on an asteroid. The proposed project is meant to increase productivity at 1/10 the cost of making the items on Earth. However, the factory continues to be sabotaged by someone or something. As Cosmo Spacely (Mel Blanc) checks up on the "Orbiting-Ore Asteroid" again, he learns from the plant engineer Rudy-2 (Ronnie Schell) that the latest head of the factory Alexander Throttlebottom has run off, making four vice presidents of the new plant that Spacely has lost so far.

Fearing for his company (and profits), Spacely names George Jetson (George O'Hanlon) as Throttlebottom's successor and sends George and his family to the plant. While the family is thoroughly upset at being thrown from their normal lifestyle (and the plans that they had coming up that week), they set up apartments on the adjoining apartment community to the asteroid and its neighboring shopping complex, while it takes the family time to adjust.

Rudy-2 shows George around the plant as they prepare for the grand re-opening of the plant. Meanwhile, Jane (Penny Singleton) and Rosie (Jean Vander Pyl) befriend Rudy-2's wife Lucy-2 (Patti Deutsch). Judy Jetson (Tiffany) is having a hard time adjusting, and accepting the fact that she lost her chance at a date with rock star Cosmic Cosmo (Steve McClintock) which a friend of hers later takes, but soon feels better after meeting a teenaged boy named Apollo Blue (Paul Kreppel). Elroy Jetson (Patric Zimmerman) meets Rudy-2's son Teddy-2 (Dana Hill) with whom he first is at odds, but eventually befriends. George soon figures that he is ready to set the plant running again, and Mr. Spacely is all set to see the plant working full-throttle, and soon to churn out the one millionth Spacely sprocket. However, the opening-day festivities give way to panic as the factory is sabotaged once again. Over the next several days, George and Rudy-2 try to fix things, but the problems persist to the point that, fed up with the problems and thinking George is responsible, Mr. Spacely heads on up to check on things personally. Thinking he has to take charge, George stays overnight hoping to catch the saboteurs in the act, only to fall asleep and be taken off by the mysterious creatures. Elroy, Teddy-2, and their neighbor Fergie Furbelow (Russi Taylor) sneak into the plant and meet Squeep (Frank Welker), a member of a furry alien race known as Grungees (Frank Welker).

Squeep tells them (with Teddy-2 translating) that the factory is actually drilling into his people's community, which is based inside the asteroid. Soon, Jane, Judy, Apollo, Rudy-2, and Astro show up and realize what is happening as well. George is found hog-tied in the Grungees' colony, and although he soon realizes just what the factory is doing, Spacely does not. Seeing his factory at a stand-still, he starts it up (despite that it is the night and after disconnecting Rudy-2, who tries to stop him), nearly burying Elroy and Squeep alive under rubble, and prompting everyone in the asteroid to get top-side, where George manages to shut down the factory and show his boss exactly what he is doing. After some talk, when George finally stands up to his boss, telling him that all he cares about is money, they come to an agreement: the Grungees will run the plant, and create new Spacely sprockets through recycling old ones (thus stopping the further destruction of the Grungees' homes inside the asteroid).

Spacely Sprockets reaches the millionth sprocket at long last, and when George asks about being vice president, Spacely retorts, stating, "he's lucky that he'll be getting his old job back". Only when pressured by everyone else does he reluctantly promote him to vice president (without a raise). However, George knows that with the Grungees now running the plant, he is no longer needed as head of the asteroid. With heavy hearts, the Jetsons then bid their new friends goodbye, including Fergie, who attempted to stow away aboard the Jetsons' car. They then return home to Earth. As the family passes over the factory, the Grungees arrange themselves to form the words "THANKS GEORGE", as a friendly goodbye to him for saving their home.

Voice cast

 George O'Hanlon as George Jetson
 Mel Blanc as Mr. Cosmo Spacely 
 Penny Singleton as Jane Jetson
 Tiffany as Judy Jetson
 Patric Zimmerman as Elroy Jetson
 Don Messick as Astro the Space Mutt
 Jean Vander Pyl as Rosie the Robot
 Ronnie Schell as Rudy-2
 Patti Deutsch as Lucy-2
 Dana Hill as Teddy-2
 Paul Kreppel as Apollo Blue
 Russi Taylor as Fergie Furbelow
 Brad Garrett as Bertie Furbelow
 B.J. Ward as Gertie Furbelow
 Steve McClintock as Cosmic Cosmo
 Rick Dees as Rocket Rick Ragnarok
 Frank Welker as Squeep / Grungees
 Janet Waldo as Robot secretary
 Susan Silo as Gertrude
 Jim Ward as Mac
 Brian Cummings as Movie Announcer
 Michael Bell, Jeff Bergman and Rob Paulsen as Board members
 Michael Bell and Frank Welker as basketball coaches.
 Bergman also does additional dialogue for George Jetson and Mr. Spacely after the deaths of O'Hanlon and Blanc who died during the production of this film.

Production
A film adaptation based on The Jetsons started development when Paramount Pictures first tried to film a live-action version around 1985, which was to be executive produced by Gary Nardino. However, the project never got far into production, putting the film into a turnaround. Later on during the 1980s, Universal Pictures bought the film rights for The Jetsons from Hanna-Barbera Productions.

A problem that arose during production of the film was the advanced age and poor health of many of the voice actors from the series; all of the major cast members except Don Messick (himself in his early 60s) were over 65 years old by this point. Daws Butler, the voice of Elroy, fell ill with a stroke and pneumonia in early 1988, before he could record any lines for the film, and ultimately died on May 18. Though Butler had been training Joe Bevilacqua and Greg Burson to succeed him, voice coordinator Kris Zimmerman brought in her then-husband Patric, then a relative unknown, to fill the role of Elroy. George O'Hanlon, who had already been in ill health throughout the 1980s run of the series, died of a stroke on February 11, 1989 after he finished recording; voice director Andrea Romano later recalled that he could record only an hour at a time due to ill health and had his final stroke while at the studio. Mel Blanc also died during production of the film on July 10, 1989. Voice actor Jeff Bergman would later step in and fill in for both O'Hanlon and Blanc as George Jetson and Mr. Spacely to complete their dialogue in additional scenes of the film.

Janet Waldo, the original voice of Judy Jetson, recorded the role for the film, but her voice was later replaced by singer Tiffany (though Waldo still provided the voice of a robot secretary and some of Judy's lines by Waldo remain in the film). Studio executives hoped that Tiffany's involvement would result in a stronger box office performance. Displeased with the casting change, Romano attempted to have her name removed from the finished film. Tiffany said her singing voice was what initially drew the attention of Barbera. Tiffany sang three songs used in the film ("I Always Thought I'd See You Again", "You and Me" and "Home"), which are on the soundtrack album along with "Jetsons' Rap" by XXL and tracks by other artists. Tiffany did not write any of the songs, but she cited "I Always Thought I'd See You Again" as one of her favorites to sing.

Release
Jetsons: The Movie was originally slated for a December 1989 release, but was delayed to avoid competition with Disney's The Little Mermaid, Don Bluth's All Dogs Go to Heaven (which were both released on the same day), Universal's own Back to the Future Part II and Warner Bros.' National Lampoon's Christmas Vacation. Universal released The Wizard in its place.

Marketing
A behind-the-scenes featurette of the movie was showcased during the broadcast special Hanna-Barbera's 50th: A Yabba Dabba Doo Celebration that aired on TNT on July 17, 1989. The segment includes work in progress pencil tests, set designs of the environments and a recording session of the song "I Always Thought I'd See You Again" performed by Tiffany, the voice of Judy Jetson in the film.

During the summer of the film's release, Kool-Aid had a tie-in where Kool-Aid points could be redeemed for a red Jetsons car featuring the cast. However, the promotion was not carried by some theaters, and instead of a red Jetsons car, the points were redeemed for a miniature film poster. Wendy's restaurants had a Jetsons kids' meal tie-in. When clips were shown on television, scenes with George had re-dubbed lines from an unnamed voice actor. The commercials showed Wendy's founder Dave Thomas either in a theater watching the movie or at his restaurant promoting the film. 

A tie-in simulator ride named The Funtastic World of Hanna-Barbera opened at Universal Studios Florida one month before the film's release. In the attraction, William Hanna and Joseph Barbera state that the Jetsons will star in their next project (presuming the film), which angers Dick Dastardly and Muttley and leads them to kidnap Elroy. Yogi Bear and Boo-Boo Bear must save Elroy by riding through the worlds of The Flintstones, Scooby-Doo, and The Jetsons. Merchandise based on the film and other Hanna-Barbera-related stuff was sold at the ride's gift shop. Also in 1990, Ralston released an apple and cinnamon–flavored Jetsons cereal.

Home media
The film was first released on home video on VHS, Betamax, and Laserdisc on October 25, 1990. In contrast to the theatrical release, the initial video release presented it in an open matte full screen format. On April 28, 2009, it received a region 1 DVD release in its original widescreen format, with a re-release in new packaging art on September 8, 2015. Prior to this, the film had only been released on DVD in international countries such as Europe and Australia in the early 2000s. It is also available via digital download on the Sony Entertainment Network and the iTunes Store. A Region B Blu-ray was released on June 6, 2016, and in Region A on February 16, 2021 by Kino Lorber (under license from Universal). This release included a commentary track by author and film historian Lee Gamber, an audio interview with Jeff Bergman, the option for viewers to listen to John Debney's music score in 5.1 DTS-HD and in lossless stereo, and the film's theatrical trailer.

Reception

Box office
The film opened at fourth place, behind Die Hard 2, Days of Thunder and Dick Tracy, with a weekend gross of $5 million from 1,562 theaters. The film then lost 43% of its audience in its second weekend, falling to tenth place with a second weekend gross of $2.9 million, and bringing its ten-day gross to $10.9 million. It ended up grossing just $20.3 million in the United States. While made on a budget of $8 million, Universal spent $12 million on marketing, hurting its ability to turn a profit.

Critical response
On review aggregation website Rotten Tomatoes, the film has an approval rating of 27% based on 15 reviews, with an average rating of 4.4/10. On Metacritic, it has a score of 46 out of 100 based on 17 reviews indicating "mixed or average reviews".

Charles Solomon of the Los Angeles Times criticized the filmmakers for not deciding "whether they're making a with-it musical for teen-agers or re-creating the ingenuous humor of a '60s TV show". He also criticized the film's use of CGI, claiming it makes the 2D characters "look as though they stumbled in from another film. Their prominent shadows give them an odd, plastic texture, but don't help them fit into the computerized world." Siskel & Ebert gave this film two thumbs down, citing both the story and the animation as having "no imagination whatsoever". Roger Ebert later named it one of the ten worst films of 1990.

Janet Maslin of The New York Times wrote the film would "appeal only to small children, and only to the most patient among them. On the positive side, it has a bright, perky look and a few amusing gadgets, like the machine that bathes and washes George Jetson after ejecting him from his bed...On the other hand, the film isn't any more fascinating than the television cartoon series that inspired it. It's only longer." William Thomas of Empire Magazine gave the film two out of five stars, stating "it's not nearly exciting enough and at an hour and twenty minutes is overlong for animation fans, yet by virtue of the fact it's a cartoon, it presents itself as too childish for older live action devotees."

See also
 List of films based on television programs
 List of films based on Hanna-Barbera cartoons

References

Notes

External links

 
 
 
 
 
 

1990 films
1990 animated films
1990s American animated films
1990 comedy films
1990s science fiction comedy films
American children's animated comic science fiction films
American children's animated comedy films
American robot films
1990s English-language films
Animated films based on animated series
Animated films about robots
Children's science fiction films
Flying cars in fiction
The Jetsons films
Hanna-Barbera animated films
Universal Pictures animated films
Films set in the 2060s
Films scored by John Debney
Films produced by William Hanna
Films produced by Joseph Barbera
Films directed by William Hanna
Films directed by Joseph Barbera